This is a list of butterflies of Sulawesi. This list includes the species found on the main island of Sulawesi, but also the species found in the Sulawesi region, which also includes the Sangihe and Talaud archipelagoes, the Banggai and Sula archipelagoes, Buton and nearby islands, the Tukangbesi archipelago and islands to the south including Selayar Island and Kalao Island. Sulawesi is in Wallacea sharing fauna between the Australasian realm and the Indomalayan realm. Sulawesi shows signs of both. About 560 species are known from Sulawesi. Of these, 239 are endemic to the region.

Hesperiidae

Coeliadinae
Burara oedipodea excellens Hopffer, 1874
Burara tuckeri Elwes & Edwards, 1897
Burara phul Mabille, 1876
Burara imperialis imperialis Plötz, 1886
Burara imperialis veteratrix Detani, 1983
Burara aphrodite Fruhstorfer, 1905
Burara gomata radiosa Plötz, 1885
Bibabis iluska iluska Hewitson, 1867
Bibabis sena senata Evans, 1934
Hasora umbrina Mabille, 1891
Hasora chromus Cramer, 1782
Hasora taminatus attenuata Staudinger, 1889
Hasora mixta fenestrata Fruhstorfer, 1911
Hasora badra badra Moore, 1858
Hasora sakit Maruyama & Uehara, 1992
Hasora quadripunctata celebica Staudinger, 1889
Hasora vitta sula Evans, 1932
Hasora moestissima Mabille, 1876
Hasora khoda burgeri Ribbe, 1889
Hasora leucospila leucospila Mabille, 1891
Badamia exclamationis Fabricius, 1775
Choaspes plateni plateni Staudinger, 1888
Choaspes hemixanthus wallacei Tsukiyama & Chiba, 1991

Pyrginae
Celaenorrhinus ficulnea tola Hewitson, 1878
Celaenorrhinus ruficornis area Plötz, 1885
Celaenorrhinus asmara palajava Staudinger, 1889
Celaenorrhinus dhanada snelleni Fruhstorfer, 1909
Odina chrysomelaena Mabille, 1891
Pseudocoladenia dan eacus Latreille, 1823
Coladenia kehelatha Hewitson, 1878
Gerosis celebica celebica Felder & Felder, 1867
Gerosis celebica sulina Evans, 1932
Tagiades japetus prasnaja Fruhstorfer, 1910
Tagiades japetus obscurata Staudinger, 1859
Tagiades japetus navus Fruhstorfer, 1910
Tagiades trebellius trebellius Hopffer, 1874
Tagiades trebellius mitra Mabille, 1895
Tagiades trebellius sem Mabille, 1883
Odontoptilum angulatum helias Felder & Felder, 1867
Caprona agama agama Moore, 1858

Hesperiinae
Halpe beturia Hewitson, 1868
Halpe damar damar Bedford Russell, 1984
Halpe damar tsukadai Maruyama, 1989
Halpe albicilia Tsukiyama & Chiba, 1991
Psolos fuligo fuscula Snellen, 1878
Ancistroides longicornis Butler, 1874
Notocrypta paralysos yaya Fruhstorfer, 1911
Notocrypta feisthamelii celebensis Staudinger, 1889
Cupitha purreea Moore, 1877
Zographetus rama Mabille, 1877
Zographetus abima Hewitson, 1877
Plastingia mangola Evans, 1949
Plastingia tessellata tessellata Hewitson, 1866
Plastingia tessellata tessa Evans, 1949
Plastingia flavescens Felder, 1867
Lotongus calathus taprobanus Plötz, 1885
Gangara thyrsis Fabricius, 1775
Gangara tumpa de Jong, 1992
Erionota thrax thrax Linnaeus, 1767
Erionota hasdrubal Fruhstorfer, 1910
Erionota hiraca sakita Ribbe, 1895
Ilma irvina Plötz, 1886
Matapa celsina Felder & Felder, 1867
Matapa intermedia intermedia de Jong, 1983
Acerbas azona Hewitson, 1866
Acerbas latefascia de Jong, 1982
Acerbas suttoni Bedford Russell, 1984
Pirdana ismene Felder & Felder, 1867
Taractrocera ardonia Hewitson, 1868
Taractrocera luzonensis dongala Evans, 1932
Taractrocera luzonensis bessa Evans, 1949
Taractrocera nigrolimbata talantus Plötz, 1885
Oriens alfurus Plötz, 1885
Potanthus omaha nita Evans, 1934
Potanthus fettingi nikaja Fruhstorfer, 1911
Potanthus pava Fruhstorfer, 1911
Potanthus hetaerus dina Evans, 1934
Telicota colon vaja Corbet, 1942
Telicota colon argeus Plötz, 1883
Telicota ohara rahula Fruhstorfer, 1911
Telicota ternatensis testa Evans, 1934
Telicota ternatensis ranga Evans, 1949
Telicota ternatensis sula Evans, 1949
Cephrenes acalle acalle Hopffer, 1874
Cephrenes augiades augiades Felder & Felder, 1860
Prusiana kuehni kuehni Plötz, 1886
Prusiana hercules Mabille, 1889
Prusiana prusias matinus Fruhstorfer, 1911
Prusiana prusias prusias Felder & Felder, 1861
Parnara kawazoei Chiba & Eliot, 1991
Parnara bada bada Moore, 1878
Borbo cinnara Wallace, 1866
Borbo bevani Moore, 1878
Pelopidas agna agna Moore, 1866
Pelopidas mathias mathias Fabricius, 1798
Polytremis lubricans lubricans Herrich-Schäffer, 1869
Caltoris bromus bromus Leech, 1894
Caltoris philippina philippina Herrich-Schäffer, 1869
Caltoris mehavagga Fruhstorfer, 1911
Caltoris beraka Plötz, 1885

Papilionidae

Papilioninae
Troides hypolitus cellularis Rothschild, 1895
Troides hypolitus caelicola Haugum & Low, 1982
Troides hypolitus sulaensis Staudinger, 1895
Troides helena hephaestus Felder & Felder, 1864
Troides oblongomaculatus thestius Staudinger, 1895
Troides oblongomaculatus bouruensis Wallace, 1865
Troides haliphron haliphron Boisduval, 1836
Troides haliphron pallens Oberthür, 1879
Troides haliphron pistor Rothschild, 1896
Troides haliphron purahu Kobayashi, 1987
Troides criton celebensis Wallace, 1865
Troides criton selayarensis Kobayashi & Koiwaya, 1981
Troides dohertyi Rippon, 1893
Ornithoptera croesus sananaensis Tsukada & Nishiyama, 1980
Atrophaneura kuehni mesolamprus Rothschild, 1908
Atrophaneura kuehni kuehni Honrath, 1886
Atrophaneura dixoni Grose Smith, 1901
Losaria palu Martin, 1912
Pachliopta polyphontes polyphontes Boisduval, 1836
Pachliopta polyphontes aipytos Fruhstorfer, 1908
Pachliopta polyphontes rosea Oberthür, 1879
Pachliopta adamas agricola Tsukada & Nishiyama, 1980
Chilasa veiovis Hewitson, 1865
Papilio blumei blumei Boisduval, 1836
Papilio blumei fruhstorferi Röber, 1897
Papilio peranthus adamantius Felder & Felder, 1864
Papilio peranthus insulicola Rothschild, 1896
Papilio peranthus intermedius Snellen, 1890
Papilio peranthus kransi Jurriaanse & Lindemans, 1920
Papilio peranthus wangiwangiensis Kitahara, 1989
Papilio gigon gigon Felder & Felder, 1864
Papilio gigon neriotes Rothschild, 1908
Papilio gigon mangolinus Fruhstorfer, 1899
Papilio sataspes sataspes Felder & Felder, 1864
Papilio sataspes artaphernes Honrath, 1886
Papilio sataspes ahasverus Staudinger, 1895
Papilio hipponous Felder & Felder, 1862
Papilio fuscus minor Oberthür, 1879
Papilio fuscus pertinax Wallace, 1865
Papilio fuscus lunifer Rothschild, 1895
Papilio fuscus porrothenus Jordan, 1909
Papilio fuscus wasiensis Hanafusa, 1991
Papilio fuscus metagenes Fruhstorfer, 1904
Papilio fuscus talyabona Joicey & Talbot, 1932
Papilio alphenor perversus Rothschild, 1895
Papilio alphenor polycritos Fruhstorfer, 1901
Papilio polytes alcindor Oberthür, 1879
Papilio polytes tucanus Jordan, 1909
Papilio jordani Fruhstorfer, 1906
Papilio rumanzovia Eschscholtz, 1821
Papilio memnon kalaomemnon Hachitani, 1987
Papilio ascalaphus ascalaphus Boisduval, 1836
Papilio ascalaphus munascalaphus Hachitani, 1988
Papilio ascalaphus fukuyamai Detani, 1983
Papilio ascalaphus ascalon Staudinger, 1895
Papilio demoleus libanius Fruhstorfer, 1908
Graphium codrus celebensis Wallace, 1865
Graphium codrus taloranus Jordan, 1909
Graphium codrus stiris Jordan, 1909
Graphium monticolus textrix Tsukada & Nishiyama, 1980
Graphium monticolus monticolus Fruhstorfer, 1896
Graphium anthedon milon Felder & Felder, 1865
Graphium anthedon coelius Fruhstorfer, 1899
Graphium eurypylus pamphylus Felder & Felder, 1865
Graphium eurypylus sangira Oberthür, 1879
Graphium eurypylus gordion Felder & Felder, 1864
Graphium eurypylus insularis Rothschild, 1896
Graphium eurypylus fumikoe Detani, 1983
Graphium eurypylus arctofasciatus Lathy, 1899
Graphium meyeri meyeri Hopffer, 1874
Graphium meyeri extremum Tsukada & Nishiyama, 1980
Graphium agamemnon comodus Fruhstorfer, 1903
Graphium rhesus rhesus Boisduval, 1836
Graphium rhesus rhesulus Fruhstorfer, 1902
Graphium rhesus rhapia Jordan, 1908
Graphium rhesus parvimacula Joicey & Talbot, 1922
Graphium androcles androcles Boisduval, 1836
Graphium androcles pelengensis Detani, 1983
Graphium androcles cleomenes Fruhstorfer, 1911
Graphium dorcus dorcus de Haan, 1840
Graphium dorcus ventus Tsukada & Nishiyama, 1980
Graphium dorcus butungensis Hanafusa, 1997
Graphium antiphates kurosawai Igarashi, 1979
Graphium antiphates kalaoensis Rothschild, 1896
Graphium euphrates elegantia Tsukada & Nishiyama, 1980
Graphium encelades Boisduval, 1836
Graphium deucalion deucalion Boisduval, 1836
Graphium deucalion marabuntana Detani, 1983
Lamproptera meges ennius Felder & Felder, 1865
Lamproptera meges akirai Tsukada & Nishiyama, 1980

Pieridae

Coliadinae
Gandaca butyrosa samanga Fruhstorfer, 1910
Gandaca harina auriflua Fruhstorfer, 1898
Eurema brigitta ina Eliot, 1956
Eurema hecabe latimargo Hopffer, 1874
Eurema hecabe sinda Fruhstorfer, 1910
Eurema hecabe dentyris Fruhstorfer, 1910
Eurema hecabe kalidupa Fruhstorfer, 1910
Eurema alitha zita Felder & Felder, 1865
Eurema alitha lorquini Felder & Felder, 1865
Eurema alitha sangira Fruhstorfer, 1910
Eurema alitha djampeana Fruhstorfer, 1908
Eurema blanda norbana Fruhstorfer, 1910
Eurema blanda odinia Fruhstorfer, 1910
Eurema irena Corbet & Pendlebury, 1932
Eurema celebensis celebensis Wallace, 1867
Eurema celebensis exophthalma Fruhstorfer, 1910
Eurema tominia tominia Vollenhoven, 1865
Eurema tominia theristra Fruhstorfer, 1911
Eurema tominia talissa Westwood, 1888
Eurema tominia halesa Fruhstorfer, 1910
Eurema tominia arsia Fruhstorfer, 1910
Eurema tominia faunia Fruhstorfer, 1910
Eurema tominia mangolina Fruhstorfer, 1910
Catopsilia scylla asema Staudinger, 1885
Catopsilia scylla bangkejana Fruhstorfer, 1903
Catopsilia pyranthe pyranthe Linnaeus, 1758
Catopsilia pomona flava Butler, 1869
Catopsilia pomona dionysiades Fruhstorfer, 1911
Catopsilia pomona rivalis Fruhstorfer, 1910

Pierinae
Hebomoia glaucippe celebensis Wallace, 1863
Hebomoia glaucippe uedai Morita, 1996
Hebomoia glaucippe sangirica Fruhstorfer, 1911
Hebomoia glaucippe sulaensis Fruhstorfer, 1908
Hebomoia leucippe detanii Nishimura, 1983
Pareronia tritaea tritaea Felder & Felder, 1859
Pareronia tritaea bargylia Fruhstorfer, 1910
Pareronia tritaea bilinearis Fruhstorfer, 1910
Pareronia tritaea octaviae Snellen, 1894
Pareronia tritaea binongkoensis Hanafusa, 1998
Pareronia tritaea illustris Hanafusa, 1991
Pareronia tritaea sarasinorum Martin, 1913
Pareronia tritaea hermocinia Fruhstorfer, 1910
Pareronia tritaea sulaensis Joicey & Talbot, 1926
Ixias piepersi Snellen, 1878
Ixias paluensis Martin, 1914
Leptosia nina dione Wallace, 1867
Leptosia nina aebutia Fruhstorfer, 1910
Leptosia lignea Vollenhoven, 1865
Elodina egnatia boisduvali Fruhstorfer, 1911
Elodina sota Eliot, 1956
Elodina dispar Röber, 1887
Delias kuehni prinsi Martin, 1912
Delias kuehni kuehni Honrath, 1886
Delias kuehni sulana Staudinger, 1894
Delias battana battana Fruhstorfer, 1896
Delias battana ariae Nakano, 1993
Delias shirozui Yata, 1981
Delias surprisa Martin, 1913
Delias benasu benasu Martin, 1912
Delias zebuda Hewitson, 1862
Delias melusina Staudinger, 1891
Delias kazueae Kitahara, 1986
Delias rosenbergi rosenbergi Vollenhoven, 1865
Delias rosenbergi chrysoleuca Mitis, 1893
Delias rosenbergi saleyerana Rothschild, 1915
Delias rosenbergi munaensis Nakano, 1988
Delias mitisi banggaiensis Talbot, 1928
Delias mitisi mitisi Staudinger, 1894
Appias lyncida gellia Fruhstorfer, 1910
Appias lyncida lycaste Felder & Felder, 1865
Appias lyncida lutatia Fruhstorfer, 1910
Appias lyncida floresiana Butler, 1898
Appias ithome Felder & Felder, 1859
Appias hombroni hombroni Lucas, 1852
Appias hombroni tombugensis Fruhstorfer, 1902
Appias hombroni sulanorum Fruhstorfer, 1902
Appias aegis polisma Hewitson, 1861
Appias aegis aegina Fruhstorfer, 1899
Appias aegis gerasa Fruhstorfer, 1910
Appias urania Wallace, 1867
Appias nero acuminata Snellen, 1890
Appias zarinda zarinda Boisduval, 1836
Appias zarinda phestus Westwood, 1888
Appias zarinda sulana Fruhstorfer, 1899
Appias albina albina Boisduval, 1836
Appias paulina albata Hopffer, 1874
Saletara panda nigerrima Holland, 1891
Saletara panda watanabei Detani, 1983
Saletara panda aurantiaca Staudinger, 1894
Cepora timnatha timnatha Hewitson, 1862
Cepora timnatha filia Fruhstorfer, 1902
Cepora timnatha aurulenta Fruhstorfer, 1899
Cepora timnatha filiola Fruhstorfer, 1899
Cepora timnatha soror Fruhstorfer, 1899
Cepora celebensis celebensis Rothschild, 1892
Cepora celebensis kazuyoe Watanabe, 1987
Cepora eurygonia Hopffer, 1874
Cepora perimale toekangbesiensis Jurriaanse & Lindemans, 1920
Cepora perimale kuehni Röber, 1885
Cepora iudith Fabricius, 1787
Cepora aspasia talautensis Niepelt, 1926
Cepora eperia Boisduval, 1836
Cepora fora papayatana Watanabe, 1987
Cepora fora fora Fruhstorfer, 1897
Cepora fora milos Watanabe, 1987
Aoa affinis Vollenhoven, 1865
Belenois java java Sparrman, 1767

Lycaenidae

Miletinae
Liphyra brassolis robusta Felder & Felder, 1865
Allotinus fallax aphacus Fruhstorfer, 1913
Allotinus major Felder & Felder, 1865
Allotinus maximus Staudinger, 1888
Allotinus samarensis Eliot, 1986
Allotinus macassarensis macassarensis Holland, 1891
Allotinus macassarensis menadensis Eliot, 1967
Allotinus albatus Felder & Felder, 1865
Allotinus unicolor zitema Fruhstorfer, 1916
Logania paluana Eliot, 1986
Logania obscura Röber, 1886
Logania dumoga Cassidy, 1995
Miletus boisduvali diotrophes Fruhstorfer, 1913
Miletus boisduvali boisduvali Moore, 1858
Miletus celinus Eliot, 1961
Miletus rosei Cassidy, 1995
Miletus leos maximus Holland, 1890
Miletus leos catoleucos Fruhstorfer, 1913
Miletus leos tellus Fruhstorfer, 1913
Miletus leos mangolicus Fruhstorfer, 1913
Spalgis epius substrigatus Snellen, 1878

Poritiinae
Poritia palos Osada, 1987
Poritia personata Osada, 1994
Deramas nigrescens Eliot, 1964
Deramas suwartinae Osada, 1987
Deramas nanae Osada, 1994
Deramas masae Kawai, 1994

Curetinae
Curetis venata venata Fruhstorfer, 1908
Curetis venata saleyerensis Chapman, 1915
Curetis tagalica celebensis Felder & Felder, 1865
Curetis tagalica talautensis Chapman, 1915
Curetis tagalica brunnescens Ribbe, 1926

Aphnaeinae
Cigaritis vulcanus (Fabricius, 1775)

Theclinae
Hypochrysops species
Hypochrysops pyrodes Cassidy 2003
Arhopala eridanus lewara Ribbe, 1926
Arhopala eridanus elfeta Hewitson, 1869
Arhopala annulata Felder, 1860
Arhopala dohertyi Bethune-Baker, 1903
Arhopala irregularis Bethune-Baker, 1903
Arhopala argentea Staudinger, 1888
Arhopala sangira Bethune-Baker, 1897
Arhopala hercules Hewitson, 1862
Arhopala quercoides Röber, 1886
Arhopala cleander sostrata Fruhstorfer, 1914
Arhopala phaenops phaenops Felder, 1865
Arhopala alitaeus alitaeus Hewitson, 1862
Arhopala acetes Hewitson, 1862
Arhopala tephlis bicolora Röber, 1886
Arhopala araxes araxes Felder & Felder, 1865
Arhopala araxes talauta Evans, 1957
Arhopala araxes verelius Fruhstorfer, 1914
Arhopala philander philander Felder & Felder, 1865
Arhopala straatmani Nieuwenhuis, 1969
Flos diardi imperiosa Fruhstorfer, 1914
Flos kuehni Röber, 1887
Flos arca de Nicéville, 1893
Flos apidanus palawanus Staudinger, 1889
Flos apidanus apidanus Cramer, 1779
Semanga helena Röber, 1887
Surendra vivarna samina Fruhstorfer, 1904
Amblypodia narada confusa Riley, 1922
Iraota rochana johnsoniana Holland, 1890
Iraota rochana mangolina Fruhstorfer, 1911
Hypothecla honos de Nicéville, 1898
Loxura atymnus sulawesiensis Takanami, 1986
Horaga syrinx permagna Fruhstorfer, 1912
Horaga selina Grose Smith, 1895
Horaga chalcedonyx taweya Cowan, 1966
Horaga sohmai Osada, 2001
Drupadia theda thaliarchus Staudinger, 1888
Drupadia theda inexpectata Ribbe, 1926
Drupadia theda namusa Hewitson, 1863
Drupadia theda bangkaiensis Ribbe, 1926
Tajuria mantra jalysus Felder & Felder, 1865
Tajuria cyrillus Hewitson, 1865
Tajuria iapyx iapyx Hewitson, 1865
Tajuria iapyx bangkaianus Ribbe, 1926
Pratapa cameria de Nicéville, 1898
Paruparo kuehni regulus Staudinger, 1888
Paruparo kuehni birumki Ribbe, 1926
Paruparo kuehni kuehni Röber, 1887
Dacalana anysis anysides Röber, 1887
Dacalana sangirica Fruhstorfer, 1912
Remelana jangala orsolina Hewitson, 1865
Hypolycaena erylus gamatius Fruhstorfer, 1912
Hypolycaena umbrata Seki & Takanami, 1988
Hypolycaena sipylus giscon Fruhstorfer, 1912
Hypolycaena xenia Grose Smith, 1895
Bindahara phocides fumata Röber, 1887
Rapala ribbei Röber, 1886
Rapala dioetas Hewitson, 1869
Rapala enipeus Staudinger, 1888
Rapala cassidyi Takanami, 1992
Rapala manea manea Hewitson, 1863
Rapala varuna olivia Druce, 1895
Deudorix cleora Miller & Miller, 1986
Deudorix epijarbas megakles Fruhstorfer, 1911
Deudorix loxius Hewitson, 1869
Artipe eryx alax Eliot, 1956
Sinthusa verriculata Snellen, 1892
Sinthusa indrasari Snellen, 1878

Polyommatinae
Anthene lycaenina Felder, 1868
Anthene paraffinis emoloides Tite, 1966
Anthene philo philo Hopffer, 1874
Anthene philo scintillans Tite, 1966
Anthene licates licates Hewitson, 1874
Anthene villosa Snellen, 1878
Cupidopsis jobates Hopffer, 1855
Una usta usta Distant, 1886
Petrelaea tombugensis Röber, 1886
Nacaduba angusta pamela Grose Smith, 1895
Nacaduba angusta sangira Fruhstorfer, 1916
Nacaduba pactolus pactolides Fruhstorfer, 1916
Nacaduba pavana azureus Röber, 1886
Nacaduba hermus hermus Felder 1860
Nacaduba subperusia paska Eliot, 1955
Nacaduba sanaya metallica Fruhstorfer, 1916
Nacaduba angelae Cassidy, 1990
Nacaduba berenice eliana Fruhstorfer, 1916
Nacaduba berenice zyrthis Fruhstorfer, 1916
Nacaduba normani titei Eliot, 1969
Nacaduba kurava menyangka Takanami, 1990
Nacaduba beroe hayashii Takanami, 1990
Nacaduba calauria calauria Felder, 1860
Psychonotis piepersii Snellen, 1878
Prosotas aluta alutina Fruhstorfer, 1916
Prosotas nora nora Felder, 1860
Prosotas pia elioti Tite, 1963
Prosotas ella Toxopeus, 1930
Prosotas gracilis gracilis Röber, 1886
Prosotas dubiosa subardates Piepers & Snellen, 1918
Nothodanis schaeffera schaeffera Erschoff, 1821
Catopyrops ancyra subfestivus Röber, 1886
Catopyrops rita bora Eliot, 1956
Catopyrops rita altijavana Toxopeus, 1930
Ionolyce helicon helicon Felder, 1860
Caleta caleta caleta Hewitson, 1876
Caleta kalawara Ribbe, 1926
caleta rhode rhode Hopffer, 1874
caleta rhode rhodana Fruhstorfer, 1918
Caleta celebensis Staudinger, 1889
Discolampa ethion ulyssides Grose Smith, 1895
Discolampa ilissus ilissus Felder, 1859
Jamides bochus phaidon Fruhstorfer, 1915
Jamides seminiger tiglath Fruhstorfer, 1915
Jamides biru Ribbe, 1926
Jamides cyta zelia Fruhstorfer, 1916
Jamides cyta hellada Fruhstorfer, 1916
Jamides snelleni Röber, 1886
Jamides celeno optimus Röber, 1886
Jamides celeno kalawarus Ribbe, 1926
Jamides tsukadai Takanami, 1994
Jamides fractilinea Tite, 1960
Jamides aratus lunata de Nicéville, 1899
Jamides aratus makitai Takanami, 1987
Jamides aratus djampeana Snellen, 1890
Jamides aratus minthe Fruhstorfer, 1916
Jamides cleodus Felder & Felder, 1865
Jamides philatus philatus Snellen, 1878
Jamides elioti Hirowatari & Cassidy, 1994
Jamides festivus festivus Röber, 1886
Jamides festivus bangkaia Ribbe, 1926
Jamides alecto luniger Toxopeus, 1930
Jamides alecto latimargus Snellen, 1878
Jamides alecto alvenus Fruhstorfer, 1916
Jamides halus Takanami, 1994
Jamides pseudosias echeilea Fruhstorfer, 1916
Jamides schatzi Röber, 1886
Jamides elpis espada Fruhstorfer, 1916
Jamides elpis comeda Fruhstorfer, 1916
Jamides celebica Eliot, 1969
Catochrysops strabo celebensis Tite, 1959
Catochrysops strabo luzonensis Tite, 1959
Catochrysops strabobinna Swinhoe, 1916
Catochrysops panormus Felder, 1860
Lampides boeticus Linnaeus, 1767
Castalius rosimon silas Fruhstorfer, 1922
Castalius fasciatus adorabilis Fruhstorfer, 1918
Castalius fasciatus fasciatus Röber, 1887
Castalius clathratus Holland, 1891
Castalius fluvialis Grose Smith, 1895
Famegana alsulus kalawarus Ribbe, 1926
Pithecops corvus corax Fruhstorfer, 1917
Pithecops phoenix Röber, 1886
Leptotes plinius plutarchus Fruhstorfer, 1922
Leptotes plinius celis Fruhstorfer, 1922
Leptotes plinius zingis Fruhstorfer, 1922
Zizeeria karsandra karsandra Moore, 1865
Zizina otis tanagra Felder, 1860
Zizula hylax hylax Fabricius, 1775
Everes lacturnus Godart, 1824
Neopithecops sumbanus sumbanus Eliot & Kawazoé, 1983
Neopithecops umbretta tituria Fruhstorfer, 1919
Neopithecops umbretta dorothea Eliot & Kawazoé, 1983
Megisba malaya sikkima Moore, 1884
Cebrella species
Sancterila deliciosa deliciosa Pagenstecher, 1896
Sancterila deliciosa sohmai Eliot & Kawazoé, 1983
Sancterila russelli Eliot & Kawazoé, 1983
Sancterila drakei Cassidy, 1995
Udara dilecta thoria Fruhstorfer, 1910
Udara rona rona Grose Smith, 1894
Udara placidula placidula Druce, 1895
Udara camenae euphon Fruhstorfer, 1910
Udara aristius lewari Ribbe, 1926
Udara aristius aristius Fruhstorfer, 1910
Udara etsuzoi Eliot & Kawazoé, 1983
Sidima sulawesiana Eliot & Kawazoé, 1983
Acytolepis puspa kuehni Röber, 1886
Acytolepis puspa deronda Fruhstorfer, 1922
Acytolepis najara Fruhstorfer, 1910
Acytolepis samanga Fruhstorfer, 1910
Celastrina philippina gradeniga Fruhstorfer, 1910
Celastrina philippina philippina Semper, 1889
Celastrina lavendularis lyce Grose Smith, 1896
Uranobothria celebica Fruhstorfer, 1917
Uranobothria tsukadai Eliot & Kawazoé, 1983
Monodontides kolari Ribbe, 1926
Monodontides cara de Nicéville, 1898
Euchrysops cnejus luzonicus Röber, 1886
Luthrodes boopis boopis (Fruhstorfer, 1897)
Chilades lajus cromyon Fruhstorfer, 1916
Freyeria putli (Kollar, [1844])

Riodinidae

Nemeobiinae
Zemeros flegyas celebensis Fruhstorfer, 1899
Zemeros flegyas sosiphanes Fruhstorfer, 1912
Zemeros emesoides Felder & Felder, 1860
Abisara echerius bugiana Fruhstorfer, 1904
Abisara echerius celebica Röber, 1886
Abisara echerius saleyra Fruhstorfer, 1914
Abisara echerius satellitica Nieuwenhuis, 1946
Abisara echerius porphyritica Fruhstorfer, 1914
Abisara kausambi sabina Stichel, 1924

Nymphalidae

Libytheinae
Libythea narina canuleia Fruhstorfer, 1909
Libythea geoffroy celebensis Staudinger, 1889

Morphinae
Faunis menado menado Hewitson, 1865
Faunis menado zenica Fruhstorfer, 1911
Faunis menado klados Brooks, 1933
Faunis menado chitone Hewitson, 1862
Faunis menado fruhstorferi Röber, 1896
Faunis menado pleonasma Röber, 1896
Faunis menado intermedius Röber, 1896
Faunis menado syllus Fruhstorfer, 1911
Faunis menado sulanus Fruhstorfer, 1899
Amathusia phidippus celebensis Fruhstorfer, 1763
Amathusia virgata thoanthea Fruhstorfer, 1911
Amathusia virgata virgata Butler, 1870
Amathuxidia plateni plateni Staudinger, 1855
Amathuxidia plateni iamos Brooks, 1937
Amathuxidia plateni pelengensis Okano, 1986
Amathuxidia plateni suprema Fruhstorfer, 1899
Discophora bambusae bambusae Felder & Felder, 1865
Discophora bambusae celebensis Holland, 1891
Discophora bambusae bangkaiensis Fruhstorfer, 1902

Satyrinae
Bletogona mycalesis unicolor Martin, 1929
Bletogona mycalesis mycalesis Felder & Felder, 1867
Bletogona inexspectata Uémura, 1987
Melanitis leda celebicola Martin, 1929
Melanitis leda leda Linnaeus, 1758
Melanitis leda bouruana Holland, 1900
Melanitis phedima linga Fruhstorfer, 1908
Melanitis velutina velutina Felder & Felder, 1867
Melanitis velutina ribbei Röber, 1886
Melanitis velutina panvila Fruhstorfer, 1911
Melanitis atrax pitya Fruhstorfer, 1911
Melanitis boisduvalia ernita Fruhstorfer, 1911
Melanitis pyrrha hylecoetes Holland, 1890
Melanitis pyrrha pyrrha Röber, 1887
Melanitis constantia salapia Fruhstorfer, 1911
Elymnias cumaea cumaea Felder & Felder, 1867
Elymnias cumaea toliana Fruhstorfer, 1899
Elymnias cumaea resplendens Martin, 1929
Elymnias cumaea bornemanni Ribbe, 1889
Elymnias cumaea phrikonis Fruhstorfer, 1899
Elymnias sangira Fruhstorfer, 1899
Elymnias mimalon mimalon Hewitson, 1862
Elymnias mimalon ino Fruhstorfer, 1894
Elymnias mimalon nysa Fruhstorfer, 1907
Elymnias hicetas rarior Martin, 1929
Elymnias hicetas hicetas Wallace, 1869
Elymnias hicetas bonthainensis Fruhstorfer, 1899
Elymnias hicetas hicetina Fruhstorfer, 1904
Elymnias hicetas butona Fruhstorfer, 1904
Elymnias hewitsoni hewitsoni Wallace, 1869
Elymnias hewitsoni atys Fruhstorfer, 1907
Elymnias hewitsoni meliophila Fruhstorfer, 1896
Zethera incerta incerta Hewitson, 1869
Zethera incerta tenggara Roos, 1992
Zethera musa Felder & Felder, 1861
Lethe europa arcuata Butler, 1868
Lethe europa nagaraja Fruhstorfer, 1911
Lethe europa velitra Fruhstorfer, 1911
Lethe europa anatha Fruhstorfer, 1911
Lethe violae Tsukada & Nishiyama, 1979
Orsotriaena medus medus Fabricius, 1775
Orsotriaena jopas jopas Hewitson, 1864
Orsotriaena jopas mendice Fruhstorfer, 1911
Orsotriaena jopas paupercula Fruhstorfer, 1908
Mycalesis itys itys Felder, 1867
Mycalesis itys remulina Fruhstorfer, 1897
Mycalesis itys sulensis Grose Smith & Kirby, 1896
Mycalesis janardana opaculus Fruhstorfer, 1908
Mycalesis janardana besina Fruhstorfer, 1908
Mycalesis perseus lalassis Hewitson, 1864
Mycalesis horsfieldi tessimus Fruhstorfer, 1908
Mycalesis horsfieldi newayana Fruhstorfer, 1911
Mycalesis horsfieldi ptyleus Fruhstorfer, 1908
Mycalesis mynois Hewitson, 1864
Mycalesis mineus Linnaeus, 1758
Mycalesis sirius Fabricius, 1775
Lohora dexamenus Hewitson, 1862
Lohora transiens Fruhstorfer, 1908
Lohora dinon Hewitson, 1864
Lohora tilmara Fruhstorfer, 1906
Lohora anna Vane-Wright & Fermon, 2003
Lohora ophthalmicus Westwood, 1888
Lohora unipupillata Fruhstorfer, 1898
Lohora haasei Röber, 1887
Lohora muelleri Roos, 2015
Lohora inga Fruhstorfer, 1899
Lohora pandaea Hopffer, 1874
Lohora deianirina Fruhstorfer, 1897
Lohora decipiens Martin, 1929
Lohora umbrosa Roos, 1997
Lohora deianira Hewitson, 1862
Lohora imitatrix Martin, 1929
Lohora erna Fruhstorfer, 1898
Lohora tanuki Tsukada & Nishiyama, 1979
Nirvanopsis hypnus Tsukada & Nishiyama, 1979
Acrophtalmia leuce leuce Felder & Felder, 1867
Acrophtalmia leuce banggaaiensis Nieuwenhuis, 1946
Acrophtalmia leuce chionides de Nicéville, 1900
Acrophtalmia windorum Miller & Miller, 1978
Ypthimina nynias nynias Fruhstorfer, 1911
Ypthimina nynias aretas Fruhstorfer, 1911
Ypthimina nynias gadames Fruhstorfer, 1911
Ypthimina norma pusilla Fruhstorfer, 1911
Ypthimina kalelonda kalelonda Westwood, 1888
Ypthimina kalelonda celebensis Rothschild, 1892
Ypthimina kalelonda anana Fruhstorfer, 1911
Ypthimina kalelonda mangolina Uémura, 1982
Ypthimina risompae Uémura, 1982
Ypthimina ancus Fruhstorfer, 1911
Ypthimina gavalisi Martin, 1913
Ypthimina junkoae Uémura, 1999
Ypthimina loryma Hewitson, 1865

Charaxinae
Charaxes latona artemis Rothschild, 1900
Charaxes nitebis nitebis Hewitson, 1862
Charaxes nitebis sulaensis Rothschild, 1900
Charaxes affinis affinis Butler, 1865
Charaxes affinis butongensis Tsukada, 1991
Charaxes affinis spadix Tsukada, 1991
Charaxes musashi Tsukada, 1991
Charaxes mars Staudinger, 1885
Charaxes setan Detani, 1983
Charaxes solon hannibal Butler, 1869
Charaxes solon catulus Fruhstorfer, 1914
Charaxes solon brevis Tsukada, 1991
Charaxes solon iliona Tsukada, 1991
Charaxes solon mangolianus Rothschild, 1900
Charaxes bernardus repetitius Butler, 1896
Polyura inopinatus Röber, 1939
Polyura cognata cognata Vollenhoven, 1861
Polyura cognata bellona Tsukada, 1991
Polyura cognata yumikoe Nishimura, 1984
Polyura alphius piepersianus Martin, 1924
Polyura galaxia kalaonicus Rothschild, 1898

Biblidinae
Chersonesia rahria celebensis Rothschild, 1892
Chersonesia rahria banggaina Tsukada & Nishiyama, 1985
Chersonesia rahria mangolina Fruhstorfer, 1899
Cyrestis paulinus mantilis Staudinger, 1886
Cyrestis paulinus kransi Jurriaanse & Lindemans, 1920
Cyrestis paulinus kuehni Röber, 1886
Cyrestis paulinus seneca Wallace, 1869
Cyrestis heracles heracles Staudinger, 1896
Cyrestis heracles selayarensis Hanafusa, 1993
Cyrestis thyonneus celebensis Staudinger, 1896
Cyrestis thyonneus pelensis Detani, 1983
Cyrestis thyonneus sulaensis Staudinger, 1896
Cyrestis eximia Oberthür, 1879
Cyrestis strigata strigata Felder & Felder, 1867
Cyrestis strigata parthenia Röber, 1887
Cyrestis strigata bettina Fruhstorfer, 1899
Ariadne ariadne gedrosia Fruhstorfer, 1912
Ariadne specularia intermedia Fruhstorfer, 1899
Ariadne celebensis dongalae Fruhstorfer, 1903
Ariadne celebensis celebensis Holland, 1891
Ariadne merionoides merionoides Holland, 1891
Ariadne merionoides pecten Tsukada, 1985
Ariadne merionoides sulaensis Joicey & Talbot, 1922
Laringa castelnaui Felder & Felder, 1860
Dichorragia nesimachus pelurius Fruhstorfer, 1897
Dichorragia nesimachus harpalycus Fruhstorfer, 1913
Dichorragia nesimachus peisandrus Fruhstorfer, 1913
Pseudergolis avesta avesta Felder & Felder, 1867
Pseudergolis avesta toalarum Fruhstorfer, 1912
Pseudergolis avesta nimbus Tsukada, 1991
Tarattia lysanias lysanias Hewitson, 1859
Tarattia lysanias aberrans Hanafusa, 1989
Tarattia lysanias hiromii Hanafusa, 1989
Tarattia lysanias karschi Fruhstorfer, 1912
Tarattia bruijni Oberthür, 1879
Athyma libnites libnites Hewitson, 1859
Athyma libnites noctesco Tsukada, 1991
Athyma libnites nieuwenhuisi Hanafusa, 1989
Moduza lymire lymire Hewitson, 1859
Moduza lymire munaensis Hanafusa, 1989
Moduza lymire nectareus Tsukada, 1991
Moduza lymire citatus Tsukada, 1991
Moduza lymire potens Hanafusa, 1989
Moduza lymire neolymira Fruhstorfer, 1913
Moduza lycone lycone Hewitson, 1859
Moduza lycone lyconides Fruhstorfer, 1913
Moduza lycone kojimai Detani, 1983
Moduza lycone nubilus Tsukada, 1991
Lamasia lyncides lyncides Hewitson, 1859
Lamasia lyncides eutenia Fruhstorfer, 1913
Lamasia lyncides togiana Tsukada, 1991
Lamasia lyncides notus Tsukada, 1991
Lamasia lyncides amarapta Fruhstorfer, 1913
Tacola eulimene badoura Butler, 1866
Tacola eulimene hegelochus Fruhstorfer, 1913
Tacola eulimene symphelus Fruhstorfer, 1913
Pantoporia antara antara Moore, 1858
Pantoporia antara pytheas Fruhstorfer, 1913
Pantoporia antara sulana Eliot, 1969
Lasippa neriphus tawayana Fruhstorfer, 1899
Lasippa neriphus sangira Fruhstorfer, 1908
Lasippa neriphus neriphus Hewitson, 1868
Neptis celebica oresta Fruhstorfer, 1913
Neptis celebica arachroa Fruhstorfer, 1913
Neptis celebica celebica Moore, 1899
Neptis cymela anemorcia Fruhstorfer, 1913
Neptis ida ida Moore, 1858
Neptis ida celebensis Hopffer, 1874
Neptis ida sphaerica Fruhstorfer, 1907
Neptis ida saleyra Fruhstorfer, 1908
Neptis ida liliputa Martin, 1924
Neptis ida kalidupa Eliot, 1969
Neptis hylas timorensis Röber, 1891
Phaedyma daria daria Felder & Felder, 1867
Phaedyma daria hiereia Fruhstorfer, 1913
Phaedyma daria albescens Rothschild, 1892
Phaedyma daria osima Fruhstorfer, 1913
Parthenos sylvia salentia Hopffer, 1874
Parthenos sylvia sangira Talbot, 1932
Parthenos sylvia bangkaiensis Fruhstorfer, 1913
Parthenos sylvia sulana Fruhstorfer, 1898
Lexias aeetes aeetes Hewitson, 1861
Lexias aeetes phasiana Butler, 1870
Lexias aeetes satellita Jurriaanse & Lindemans, 1920
Lexias aeetes butongensis Tsukada, 1991
Lexias aeetes rubellio Fruhstorfer, 1898
Lexias aeropa orestias Fruhstorfer, 1913
Euthalia aconthea bakrii Müller, 1994
Euthalia amanda amanda Hewitson, 1862
Euthalia amanda selayarensis Tsukada, 1991
Euthalia amanda periya Fruhstorfer, 1913
Euthalia amabilis Staudinger, 1896
Dophla evelina bolitissa Fruhstorfer, 1913
Dophla evelina dermoides Rothschild, 1892
Dophla evelina bangkaiana Fruhstorfer, 1904
Dophla evelina fumosa Fruhstorfer, 1899
Bassarona labotas labotas Hewitson, 1864
Bassarona labotas pallesco Tsukada, 1991
Bassarona labotas pelengensis Yokochi, 1990

Apaturinae
Rohana macar macar Wallace, 1869
Rohana macar butongensis Tsukada, 1991
Helcyra celebensis celebensis Martin, 1913
Helcyra celebensis fabulose Tsukada, 1991
Helcyra celebensis semifusca Masui, 1999
Hestinalis divona Hewitson, 1851
Euripus robustus Wallace, 1869

Nymphalinae
Symbrenthia lilaea utakata Tsukada & Nishiyama, 1985
Symbrenthia hippoclus clausus Fruhstorfer, 1904
Symbrenthia hippoclus confluens Fruhstorfer, 1896
Symbrenthia hippoclus centho Fruhstorfer, 1904
Symbrenthia platena Staudinger, 1896
Symbrenthia hippalus Felder & Felder, 1867
Symbrenthia intricata Fruhstorfer, 1897
Vanessa buana Fruhstorfer, 1898
Kaniska canace muscosa Tsukada & Nishiyama, 1979
Junonia hedonia intermedia Felder & Felder, 1867
Junonia hedonia ida Cramer, 1775
Junonia hedonia teurnia Fruhstorfer, 1912
Junonia atlites acera Fruhstorfer, 1912
Junonia almana battana Fruhstorfer, 1906
Junonia erigone gardineri Fruhstorfer, 1902
Junonia timorensis kucil Tsukada & Kaneko, 1985
Junonia orithya kontinentalis Martin, 1920
Junonia orithya celebensis Staudinger, 1888
Junonia orithya saleyra Fruhstorfer, 1912
Junonia orithya kuehni Fruhstorfer, 1904
Junonia orithya orthosia Godart, 1823
Yoma sabina nimbus Tsukada, 1985
Yoma sabina magnus Tsukada, 1985
Rhinopalpa polynice megalonice Felder & Felder, 1867
Hypolimnas dimona Fruhstorfer, 1913
Hypolimnas diomea diomea Hewitson, 1861
Hypolimnas diomea fraterna Wallace, 1869
Hypolimnas diomea sororia Hall, 1930
Hypolimnas diomea serica Tsukada, 1985
Hypolimnas anomala stellata Fruhstorfer, 1912
Hypolimnas anomala anomala Wallace, 1869
Hypolimnas antilope phalkes Fruhstorfer, 1908
Hypolimnas antilope antilope Cramer, 1777
Hypolimnas bolina bolina Linnaeus, 1758
Hypolimnas bolina gigas Oberthür, 1879
Hypolimnas alimena talauta Fruhstorfer, 1912
Hypolimnas alimena alimena Linnaeus, 1758
Hypolimnas misippus Linnaeus, 1764
Doleschallia polibete celebensis Fruhstorfer, 1899
Doleschallia polibete polibete maturitas Tsukada, 1985
Doleschallia polibete polibete sulaensis Fruhstorfer, 1899

Danainae
Parantica cleona luciplena Fruhstorfer, 1892
Parantica cleona talautica Snellen, 1896
Parantica cleona lucida Fruhstorfer, 1899
Parantica sulewattan Fruhstorfer, 1896
Parantica toxopei Nieuwenhuis, 1969
Parantica kuekenthali Pagenstecher, 1896
Parantica dabrerai Miller & Miller, 1978
Parantica hypowattan Morishita, 1981
Parantica menadensis menadensis Moore, 1883
Parantica menadensis niuwenhuisi Detani, 1983
Ideopsis juventa tontoliensis Fruhstorfer, 1897
Ideopsis juventa tawaya Fruhstorfer, 1904
Ideopsis juventa ultramontana Martin, 1914
Ideopsis juventa ishma Butler, 1869
Ideopsis juventa lirungensis Fruhstorfer, 1899
Ideopsis juventa satellitica Fruhstorfer, 1899
Ideopsis juventa sequana Fruhstorfer, 1910
Ideopsis juventa homonyma Bryk, 1937
Ideopsis juventa kallatia Fruhstorfer, 1904
Ideopsis juventa lycosura Fruhstorfer, 1910
Ideopsis juventa sophonisbe Fruhstorfer, 1904
Ideopsis vitrea vitrea Blanchard, 1853
Ideopsis vitrea arachosia Fruhstorfer, 1910
Ideopsis vitrea ribbei Röber, 1887
Ideopsis vitrea iza Fruhstorfer, 1898
Tirumala choaspes choaspes Butler, 1886
Tirumala choaspes kalawara Martin, 1913
Tirumala choaspes kroeseni Martin, 1910
Tirumala choaspes oxynthas Fruhstorfer, 1911
Tirumala limniace makassara Martin, 1910
Tirumala limniace bentenga Martin, 1910
Tirumala limniace conjuncta Moore, 1883
Tirumala limniace ino Butler, 1871
Tirumala hamata goana Martin, 1910
Tirumala hamata talautensis Talbot, 1943
Tirumala hamata arikata Fruhstorfer, 1910
Tirumala ishmoides ishmoides Moore, 1883
Danaus plexippus plexippus Linnaeus, 1758
Danaus ismare alba Morishita, 1981
Danaus ismare fulvus Ribbe, 1890
Danaus genutia leucoglene Felder & Felder, 1865
Danaus genutia telmissus Fruhstorfer, 1910
Danaus genutia tychius Fruhstorfer, 1910
Danaus affinis fulgurata Butler, 1866
Danaus affinis taruna Fruhstorfer, 1899
Danaus affinis affinoides Fruhstorfer, 1899
Danaus affinis wentholti Martin, 1914
Danaus affinis djampeana Van Eecke, 1915
Danaus affinis hegesippinus Röber, 1891
Danaus affinis decentralis Fruhstorfer, 1899
Danaus melanippus celebensis Staudinger, 1889
Danaus melanippus meridionigra Martin, 1913
Danaus chrysippus gelderi Snellen, 1891
Danaus chrysippus bataviana Moore, 1883
Danaus chrysippus cratippus Felder, 1860
Euploea magou Martin, 1912
Euploea sylvester schlegelii Felder & Felder, 1865
Euploea sylvester glarang Martin, 1912
Euploea sylvester agapa Fruhstorfer, 1911
Euploea phaenareta celebica Fruhstorfer, 1898
Euploea phaenareta rolanda Fruhstorfer, 1904
Euploea phaenareta locupletior Fruhstorfer, 1899
Euploea configurata Felder & Felder, 1865
Euploea eupator eupator Hewitson, 1858
Euploea eupator vanoorti Jurriaanse & Lindemans, 1920
Euploea eupator thrasetes Fruhstorfer, 1911
Euploea eupator sulaensis Joicey & Talbot, 1922
Euploea leucostictos lykeia Fruhstorfer, 1910
Euploea leucostictos depuiseti Oberthür, 1879
Euploea westwoodii meyeri Hopffer, 1874
Euploea westwoodii westwoodii Felder & Felder, 1865
Euploea westwoodii leochares Fruhstorfer, 1910
Euploea westwoodii bangkaiensis Fruhstorfer, 1899
Euploea westwoodii labreyi Moore, 1883
Euploea cordelia Martin, 1912
Euploea eleusina vollenhovii Felder & Felder, 1865
Euploea eleusina anitra Fruhstorfer, 1910
Euploea eleusina palata Fruhstorfer, 1910
Euploea eleusina mniszechii Felder, 1859
Euploea eleusina aganor Fruhstorfer, 1910
Euploea hewitsonii hewitsonii Felder & Felder, 1865
Euploea hewitsonii reducta Jurriaanse, 1919
Euploea hewitsonii mangolina Fruhstorfer, 1899
Euploea hewitsonii besinensis Fruhstorfer, 1899
Euploea algea kirbyi Felder & Felder, 1865
Euploea algea horsfieldii Felder & Felder, 1865
Euploea algea bevagna Fruhstorfer, 1911
Euploea algea talautensis Piepers & Snellen, 1896
Euploea algea maura Hopffer, 1874
Euploea algea laodikeia Fruhstorfer, 1910
Euploea algea tombugensis Fruhstorfer, 1899
Euploea algea wiskotti Röber, 1887
Euploea algea corvina Fruhstorfer, 1898
Euploea core bauermanni Röber, 1885
Euploea core kalaona Fruhstorfer, 1898
Euploea latifasciata latifasciata Weymer, 1885
Euploea latifasciata hashimotoi Detani, 1983
Euploea redtenbacheri coracina Hopffer, 1874
Euploea redtenbacheri redtenbacheri Felder & Felder, 1865
Euploea redtenbacheri selayarensis Tsukada & Nishiyama, 1979
Idea blanchardii blanchardii Marchal, 1845
Idea blanchardii marosiana Fruhstorfer, 1903
Idea blanchardii paluana Martin, 1914
Idea blanchardii garunda Fruhstorfer, 1910
Idea blanchardii munaensis Fruhstorfer, 1899
Idea blanchardii phlegeton Fruhstorfer, 1904
Idea blanchardii silayara Martin, 1914
Idea blanchardii djampeana Fruhstorfer, 1899
Idea blanchardii kuehni Röber, 1887
Idea idea sula de Nicéville, 1900
Idea tambusisiana tambusisiana Bedford Russell, 1981
Idea tambusisiana hideoi Okano, 1985
Idea leuconoe godmani Oberthür, 1879
Idea leuconoe esanga Fruhstorfer, 1898

Heliconiinae
Terinos taxiles abisares Felder & Felder, 1867
Terinos taxiles poros Fruhstorfer, 1906
Terinos taxiles banggaiensis Detani, 1983
Terinos taxiles angurium Tsukada, 1985
Terinos clarissa ludmilla Staudinger, 1889
Vindula erota banta Eliot, 1956
Vindula erota boetonensis Jurriaanse & Lindemans, 1920
Vindula sulaensis Joicey & Talbot, 1924
Vindula dejone celebensis Butler, 1883
Vindula dejone susanoo Tsukada, 1985
Vindula dejone kabiana Fruhstorfer, 1912
Vindula dejone austrosundana Fruhstorfer, 1897
Vindula dejone bushi Tsukada, 1985
Vindula dejone satellitica Fruhstorfer, 1899
Vindula dejone dioneia Fruhstorfer, 1912
Cupha arias celebensis Fruhstorfer, 1899
Cupha arias sangirica Fruhstorfer, 1912
Cupha arias muna Fruhstorfer, 1897
Cupha maeonides maeonides Hewitson, 1859
Cupha maeonides butungensis Tsukada, 1985
Cupha maeonides nigrico Tsukada, 1985
Cupha maeonides maenada Grose Smith, 1898
Cupha crameri kalaoensis Tsukada, 1985
Algia fasciata lautus Tsukada, 1985
Algia fasciata angustata Fruhstorfer, 1912
Algia satyrina satyrina Felder & Felder, 1867
Algia satyrina sibylla Röber, 1887
Algia satyrina similliana Röber, 1887
Cirrochroa thule Felder & Felder, 1860
Cirrochroa semiramis Felder & Felder, 1867
Cirrochroa eremita Tsukada, 1985
Cirrochroa recondita Roos, 1996
Vagrans sinha nupta Staudinger, 1889
Phalanta alcippe celebensis Wallace, 1869
Phalanta alcippe onyx Tsukada, 1985
Phalanta alcippe aridus Tsukada, 1985
Phalanta alcippe handjahi Tsukada, 1985
Phalanta alcippe omarion Fruhstorfer, 1912
Phalanta phalantha sabulum Tsukada, 1985
Argynnis hyperbius centralis Martin, 1913
Acraea andromacha indica Röber, 1885
Acraea moluccana dohertyi Holland, 1891
Acraea moluccana parce Staudinger, 1896
Cethosia biblis sarsina Fruhstorfer, 1912
Cethosia biblis picta Felder & Felder, 1866
Cethosia biblis togiana Fruhstorfer, 1902
Cethosia myrina myrina Felder & Felder, 1867
Cethosia myrina melancholica Fruhstorfer, 1909
Cethosia myrina sarnada Fruhstorfer, 1912
Cethosia myrina vanbemmeleni Jurriaanse & Lindemans, 1918
Cethosia myrina ribbei Honrath, 1886
Cethosia tambora atia Fruhstorfer, 1905
Cethosia cydippe sangira Fruhstorfer, 1906

See also
List of Indonesian endemic butterflies

References

Sulawesi
Butterflies
Sulawesi
Sulawesi
Sulawesi
Sulawesi